The National Museum of Science and Technology is a Spanish national technology museum dedicated to technology promotion and preservation. It owns a collection of more than 19,000 scientific instruments, technological devices, vehicles, machines and industrial tools from the 16th century until nowadays. Dependent on the Ministry of Science, it is managed by the Spanish Foundation for Science and Technology (FECYT).

The museum was established on 30 June 1980 and its first location was opened on 1997 in the old Delicias railway station building in Madrid sharing premises with the Railway Museum. The museum current main exhibition hall is in La Coruña, opened on 4 May 2012, with a second exhibition hall in Alcobendas (Madrid) opened on 12 December 2014. The museum is a member of the International Council of Museums science & technology committee (CIMUSET) and of the European Network of Science Centres and Museums (ECSITE).

Among the pieces in display at La Coruña are the front section of the "Lope de Vega", an Iberia Boeing 747 in service between 1981 and 2003, airplane that brought Picasso's Guernica to Spain in September 1981, the prototype of the "Mechanical Encyclopedia", the 1949 mechanical precursor to the electronic book, by Spanish inventor Ángela Ruiz Robles, a replica of the stratonautical space suit, the 1935 precursor to the space suit, by engineer Emilio Herrera, the Fresnel lens used between 1857 and 1904 at the Tower of Hercules lighthouse and the first computer arriving in Spain, an IBM 650 computer bought by RENFE in 1959.

Gallery

References

Cultural tourism in Spain
National museums of Spain
Technology museums in Spain
Museums in Galicia (Spain)
Museums in the Community of Madrid
Museums established in 1980
1980 establishments in Spain